The Ertuğrulgazi Tunnel, is a road tunnel constructed on the Adapazarı–Bilecik state highway  in Bilecik Province, western Turkey.

It is situated between Vezirhan and Bilecik bypassing the Gülümbe Pass with hairpin turns. The -long twin-tube tunnel carries two lanes of traffic in each direction. The -long Osmangazi Tunnel is located south of it.

In 2000, a financial agreement was signed between the Turkish and Japanese governments to build a divided highway with two tunnels at the steep pass. Construction works on the highway began in 2003, and in 2010 the route was put into service. The tunnel was initially named Kaletepe Tunnel, but was renamed in 2009 in honor of Ertuğrul Gazi (1191–1281) the father of Osman I, the founder of the Ottoman Empire.

References

Road tunnels in Turkey
Transport in Bilecik Province